Pisa is a modern village situated  to the east of Olympia, Greece. Currently it is not politically independent but is a neighborhood of the village of Archea Olympia, the capital of the Municipality of Ancient Olympia, of which it is a municipal unit, Ancient Olympia, since 2011. Municipality (deme), municipal unit, village, and ancient site, all telescope at the same location under the same Greek name, archaia Olympia, although different English translations provide some diversity at the different levels. They are all in the regional unit of Elis, located on the northwest side of the geographic (not political) feature of the Peloponnesus

Modern Pisa is the putative location of ancient Pisa. Greek history tells of a contention between Olympia, Pisa, and Elis, a village of ancient Elis, for supremacy of the region and management of the sacred precinct. The existence of an ancient district called Pisatis (ἡ Πισᾶτις), which included 8 villages over half of modern Elis, is indicated by many ancient authors. Such a political unit is certain for the 4th century BC. The tradition of an earlier unit is not an unreasonable one. Eventually Olympia was victorious in the contention and Pisa became part of Olympia rather than vice versa.

Pisatis area
The current location thought to be Pisa is about 1km east of Olympia.

A confederacy of eight states apparently existed in Pisatis, of which, besides Pisa, the following names are recorded: Salmone, Heracleia, Harpinna, Cycesium, and Dyspontium. The celebration of the festival of Zeus at Olympia had originally belonged to the Pisatans, in the neighbourhood of whose city Olympia was situated.

Legendary foundations
Pisa was said to have been founded by an eponymous hero, Pisus, the son of Perieres, and grandson of Aeolus; but others derived its name from a fountain Pisa. Modern writers connect its name with Πῖσος, a low marshy ground, or with Πίσσα, the name of the black fir or pinetree. It was celebrated in mythology as the residence of Oenomaus and Pelops. The Virgilian commentator Servius wrote that the Teuti, or Pelops, the king of the Pisatans, arrived on the Tyrrhenian coast after the Trojan War and founded the Italian (and more famous) Pisa in the 13th century BCE. These traditions are regarded as having no merit of historical truth today, but are classed as folk-etymologies.

Early Olympic Games
In the eighth Olympiad (747 BCE) the Pisatans succeeded in depriving the Eleians of the presidency by calling in the assistance of Pheidon I, tyrant of Argos, in conjunction with whom they celebrated the festival. But almost immediately afterwards the power of Pheidon was destroyed by the Spartans, who not only restored to the Eleians the presidency, but are said even to have confirmed them in the possession of the Pisatis and Triphylia. 

In the Second Messenian War the Pisatans and Triphylians revolted from Elis and assisted the Messenians, while the Eleians sided with the Spartans. In this war the Pisatans were commanded by their king Pantaleon, who also succeeded in making himself master of Olympia by force, during the 34th Olympiad (644 BCE), and in celebrating the games to the exclusion of the Eleians. The conquest of the Messenians by the Spartans must also have been attended by the submission of the Pisatans to their former masters. 

In the 48th Olympiad (588 BCE) the Eleians, suspecting the fidelity of Damophon, the son of Pantaleon, invaded the Pisatis, but were persuaded by Damophon to return home without committing any further acts of hostility. But in the 52nd Olympiad (572 BCE), Pyrrhus, who had succeeded his brother Damophon in the sovereignty of Pisa, invaded Elis, assisted by the Dyspontii in the Pisatis, and by the Macistii and Scilluntii in Triphylia. This attempt ended in the ruin of these towns, which were razed to the ground by the Eleians. 

From this time Pisa disappears from history; and so complete was its destruction that the fact of its ever having existed was disputed in later times. Although Pisa ceased to exist as a city from this time, the Pisatans, in conjunction with the Arcadians, celebrated the 104th Olympic festival in 364 BCE.

Later testimonies
Pausanias found its site converted into a vineyard. Its situation, however, was perfectly well known to Pindar and Herodotus. Pindar frequently identifies it with Olympia; and Herodotus refers to Pisa and Olympia as the same point in computing the distance from the altar of the twelve gods at Athens.

See also
 Hippodamia of Pisa
 Tantalus (son of Broteas)
List of ancient Greek cities

References

Attribution

External links
 Mait Kõiv, Early History of Elis and Pisa: Invented or Evolving Traditions?

Populated places in ancient Elis
Cities in ancient Peloponnese
Former populated places in Greece
Ancient Olympia
Populated places in Elis